Marion van de Kamp (23 October 1925 – 28 May 2022) was a German actress and television announcer. 

Born in Wuppertal in 1925 to Dutch parents, she attended a drama school in Dresden, East Germany and worked at theatres in Meiningen, Görlitz, Plauen, Schwerin and Leipzig. In 1953 she started working for the Deutscher Fernsehfunk, the public East German television.

Van de Kamp died on 28 May 2022, at the age of 96.

References

External links

1925 births
2022 deaths
Actors from Wuppertal
German film actresses
German stage actresses
German television actresses
German people of Dutch descent
Radio and television announcers